Chelannur is a village in Kozhikode district in the state of Kerala, India.The village  is currently ruled by the United Democratic Front (UDF)

Demographics
 India census, Chelannur has a population of 40,697 with 19,574 males and 21,123 females.

Landmarks
 Ette Randu: 8/2 also known as the 8.2 mile road is the hub of Chelannur
 Digital Seva Common Service Center
 Ollopara, a scebuc place in Chelannur were a lot of movies have been shot
 Shri Krishna Temple
 Parappurath Shri Nagakali Temple
 Maruthad Rahma Juma Masjidh
 Sree Kizhakkayil Baghavathy Temple
 Subramanya Swamy Temple
 Viraloor Sree Narashimhamoorty Temple Kannankara
 Chelannur Mahasiva temple
 Koottakkil Farm
 koottakkil water tank
 PHC Iruvallur Ambalappad
 Kannippoyil Paikattukotta Sree Paradevatha temple
 Valottil Bhagavathi temple

Education
According to census 2011 more than 98% of students below 16 years are going to school There are currently two higher secondary schools in Chelannur namely AKKR Girls higher secondary school and Sree Narayana Guru college.

SNG College Chelannur, founded 1968.

Suburbs and Villages
 Kakkoor, Ambalathukulangara and Kumaraswamy Junction
 Kakkodimukkum Kakkodi, Muttoli and Thanneer Panthal
 Vengeri, Thadambattu Thazham and karaparamba

References

http://www.keralabanking.com/html/Chelannur.htm

Kozhikode north